A logical machine is a tool containing a set of parts that uses energy to perform formal logic operations.  Early logical machines were mechanical devices that performed basic operations in Boolean logic.  Contemporary logical machines are computer-based electronic programs that perform proof assistance with theorems in mathematical logic.  In the 21st century, these proof assistant programs have given birth to a new field of study called mathematical knowledge management.

Origins
The earliest logical machines were mechanical constructs built in the late 19th century.  William Stanley Jevons invented the first logical machine in 1869, the logic piano.  In 1883, Allan Marquand invented a new logical machine that performed the same operations as Jevons' logic piano but with improvements in design simplification, portability, and input-output controls.

See also

Allan Marquand
William Stanley Jevons
Logics for computability

References

Bibliography 
   
 Marquand, Allan
 (1883), "A Machine for Producing Syllogistic Variation" in C. S. Peirce, ed., Studies in Logic, pp. 12–15, along with "Note on an Eight-Term Logical Machine", p. 16. Google Books Eprint. Book reprinted 1983 with introduction by Max Fisch.
 (1886), "A New Logical Machine", Proceedings of the American Academy of Arts and Sciences 21: 303–07. Google Books Eprint.
 Peirce, C. S. 
 (1886 letter), Letter, Peirce to A. Marquand, 1886 December 30, published 1993 in Kloesel, C. et al., eds., Writings of Charles S. Peirce: A Chronological Edition, Vol. 5. Indiana Univ. Press, pp. 421–3. Google Books Preview.
 (1887), "Logical Machines", The American Journal of Psychology v. 1, n. 1, Baltimore: N. Murray, pp. 165–70.  Google Books Eprint. Reprinted in (1976) The New Elements of Mathematics v. III, pt. 1, pp. 625–32; (1997) Modern Logic 7:71–77, Project Euclid Eprint; and (2000) Writings of Charles S. Peirce v. 6, pp. 65–73.
 Baldwin, Mark James (1902), "Logical Machine", Dictionary of Philosophy and Psychology, pp. 28–30 Google Books  Eprint. Classics in the History of Psychology Eprint.
 Ketner, Kenneth Laine (1984), "The early history of computer design: Charles Sanders Peirce and Marquand's logical machines", with the assistance of Arthur Franklin Stewart, Princeton University Library Chronicle, v. 45, n. 3, pp. 186–211. PULC 15MB PDF Eprint.
 Dalakov, Georgi (undated), "Charles Peirce and Allan Marquand", History of Computers and Computing. Eprint.

Mathematical logic